Chintamani is a 1933 Telugu film directed by Kallakuri Sadasiva Rao about poet Bilwamangal and the courtesan Chintamani.

References

External links
 
 Chintamani, apgap.com; accessed 24 July 2015.

1930s Telugu-language films
1933 films
Indian drama films
1933 drama films
Indian black-and-white films
Indian biographical drama films
Films about courtesans in India